Selattyn and Gobowen is a civil parish in Shropshire, England. The civil parish population at the 2011 census was 4,016.

See also
Listed buildings in Selattyn and Gobowen

References

Civil parishes in Shropshire